Ilex chinensis (syn. Ilex purpurea), the Kashi holly, oriental holly, or purple holly, is a species of flowering plant in the family Aquifoliaceae, native to Vietnam, southern China, Taiwan, and central and southern Japan.

Uses
It is one of the 50 fundamental herbs used in traditional Chinese medicine, where it has the name dōng qīng. In traditional Chinese medicine, it is said to promote circulation, remove stasis, and clear heat and toxins. It is believed to improve conditions such as angina, high blood pressure, uveitis, coughs, chest congestion, and asthma. The root of Ilex purpurea can be applied topically to skin infections and burns, and to wounds. It has found use as a street tree in a number of Chinese and European cities.

References

chinensis
Plants used in traditional Chinese medicine
Flora of Vietnam
Flora of South-Central China
Flora of Southeast China
Flora of Taiwan
Flora of Japan
Plants described in 1819